The 2023 WTA Finals is the professional women's championship tennis tournament run by the Women's Tennis Association (WTA). It is the 52nd edition of the singles event and the 47th edition of the doubles competition and is scheduled to take place in Shenzhen, China in late October 2023 marking the return in China for the first time since 2019 after COVID-19 restrictions in the country. The tournament is held on an indoor hardcourt and is contested by the eight highest-ranked singles players and doubles teams of the 2023 WTA Tour.

Qualifying 
In the singles, point totals are calculated by combining point totals from sixteen tournaments (excluding ITF and WTA 125 tournaments). Of these sixteen tournaments, a player's results from the four Grand Slam events, the four WTA 1000 tournaments with 1,000 points for the winner, and (for the players who played the main draw of least 2 such tournaments) the best results from two WTA 1000 tournaments with 900 points for the winner must be included.

In the doubles, point totals are calculated by any combination of eleven tournaments throughout the year. Unlike in the singles, this combination does not need to include results from the Grand Slams or WTA 1000 tournaments.

Format 
Both the singles and doubles event features eight players/teams in a round-robin event, split into two groups of four.

Over the first four days of competition, each player/team meets the other three players/teams in her group, with the top two in each group advancing to the semifinals. The first-placed player/team in one group meets the second-placed player/team in the other group, and vice versa. The winners of each semifinal meet in the championship match.

Round robin tie-breaking methods 
The final standings are made using these methods:

 Greatest number of match wins.
 Greatest number of matches played.
 Head-to-head results if only two players are tied, or if three players are tied then:

a. If three players each have the same number of wins, a player having played less than all three matches is automatically eliminated and the player advancing to the single elimination competition is the winner of the match-up of the two remaining tied players.
b. Highest percentage of sets won.
c. Highest percentage of games won.

Points breakdown
Updated .

Singles

Notes

Doubles

See also
WTA rankings
2023 WTA Tour
2023 ATP Finals

References

External links

WTA Finals
2023 in Chinese sport
Tennis tournaments in China
October 2023 sports events in Asia